State Trunk Highway 35 (STH-35, WIS 35) is a Wisconsin state highway running north–south across western Wisconsin. It is 412.15 miles in length, and is the longest state highway in Wisconsin. Portions of WIS 35 are part of the Great River Road.

Route description
WIS 35 is a major north–south route through westernmost Wisconsin, often following close to the state border. Because of the lower population of counties along the state's western border with Iowa and Minnesota, it is a mostly rural routing with lower traffic counts than in other parts of the state. WIS 35 is also the terminus of 15 different state, US, and Interstate highways along its route.

Illinois state line to Prairie du Chien
It continues on into that state as Illinois Route 35 (IL 35), which is the shortest state highway in Illinois.

From the state line, WIS 35 continues north for about a mile (1.6 km) before intersecting with WIS 11 at Badger Road. This section of highway is the only segment of WIS 35 between the state line and Prairie du Chien, with the exception of the stretch between WIS 81 and Bloomington, that is not co-signed with at least one other highway.

WIS 35/WIS 11 continues to the west to the interchange with U.S. Highway 61 (US 61) and US 151, as the two US Highways enter Wisconsin after crossing the Mississippi River from Dubuque, Iowa.

WIS 11 terminates at the Welcome Center on the other side of US 61/US 151, while WIS 35 continues north with the two US routes on an expressway to the city of Dickeyville. WIS 35 and US 61 exit the freeway to the northwest into Dickeyville at exit 8, while US 151 continues north towards Platteville.

WIS 35 and US 61 continue to the northwest to the village of Tennyson before heading north towards the city of Lancaster. On the outskirts of Lancaster, WIS 35 and US 61 interchange with WIS 81, which continues on into the city with the other two routes.

After intersecting with the southern terminus of WIS 129, the three routes enter Lancaster as Madison Street. In downtown Lancaster, at the Grant County Courthouse square, Madison Street becomes one-way northbound at Cherry Street. WIS 35 and WIS 81 turn left a block north at West Maple Street, while US 61 continues north on North Madison Street out of the city. On the west side of the Courthouse Square, WIS 35/WIS 81 turns south on South Jefferson Street for one block to West Cherry Street. The two state highways then head west for two blocks. At South Harrison Street, WIS 35/WIS 81 heads south for two blocks before turning southwest and out of the city.

About a mile (1.6 km) outside the city limits of Lancaster, WIS 35/WIS 81 turns in a westerly direction for about  before the two highways split up in rural Grant County. WIS 81 continues southwest towards Beetown, while WIS 35 heads northwest toward the village of Bloomington.

On the northwest side of Bloomington, WIS 35 intersects with WIS 133 at 4th Street. The two highways continue in a generally northerly direction towards the village of Patch Grove, where they intersect with US 18. WIS 133 turns east with US 18, while WIS 35 continues towards the northwest with US 18 towards the Wisconsin River and Bridgeport.

Crossing the Wisconsin River into Crawford County, WIS 35/US 18 intersects with WIS 60 in Bridgeport, with the three highways continuing on into the city of Prairie du Chien as South Marquette Road.

Prairie du Chien to La Crosse

At Wisconsin Street in downtown Prairie du Chien, US 18 and WIS 60 head west as a one-way street to the bridge crossing the Mississippi into Marquette, Iowa. Eastbound US 18 and WIS 60 joins WIS 35 one block prior at Iowa Street.

One block north of Wisconsin Street, WIS 35 meets the western terminus of WIS 27 at East Blackhawk Avenue. WIS 35 continues north out of the city, becoming the Great River Road. WIS 35 runs along the Mississippi River's east banks through the cities of Lynxville and Ferryville.

In downtown De Soto, WIS 82 heads to the Northeast as Main Street, while WIS 35 continues across the Vernon County line.

WIS 35 continues north along the eastern banks of the Mississippi River into the city of Genoa. Here, it meets another western terminus of a state highway, WIS 56 at Main Street. WIS 35 continues north to the city of Stoddard, where it meets yet another western terminus, this time of WIS 162 at Division Street. WIS 35 continues to the north and into La Crosse County.

Upon entering the southern edge of the city of La Crosse, WIS 35 interchanges with US 14 and US 61. The three routes continue into the city as Mormon Coulee Road. At Ward Avenue, the street name changes to South Avenue until it reaches West Avenue. At that intersection, northbound traffic for WIS 35 turns north onto West Avenue, while US 14/US 61 continue on South Avenue.

At La Crosse Street, the route intersects with WIS 16. North of La Crosse Street, West Avenue becomes Lang Drive, crossing over the La Crosse River. On the other side of the river, Lang Drive becomes George Street. WIS 35 continues north on George Street through North La Crosse before joining US 53 just south of exit 3 on Interstate 90.

La Crosse to Hudson
WIS 35 continues north on the Great River Road while US 53 heads east on I-90 for a mile (1.6 km) to exit 4. Upon entering the city of Onalaska, WIS 35 becomes Second Avenue.

WIS 35 continues along the eastern banks of the Mississippi River, running parallel to the US 53 freeway to the east before interchanging with it just south of Holmen. Business WIS 35 continues north into Holmen as County Trunk Highway HD (CTH-HD, Holmen Drive), while WIS 35 and US 53 bypass the city to the west.

On the north side of Holmen, WIS 35 leaves the freeway and turns west back towards the river, while US 53 continues north with WIS 93. WIS 93 south terminates at the interchange with WIS 35.

WIS 35 enters the village of Trempealeau on Third Street before turning north on Main Street on the western edge of downtown Trempeleau. WIS 35 continues north to its intersection with WIS 54 and WIS 93. WIS 93 continues north while WIS 35/WIS 54 heads west, crossing into Buffalo County into the unincorporated community of East Winona.

In East Winona, WIS 54 turns south and crosses the river into Winona, Minnesota, where it becomes Minnesota State Highway 43 (MN 43). WIS 35 continues along the eastern banks of the Mississippi River as the Great River Road, into Fountain City. Upon entering the city limits, WIS 35 becomes Main Street, before turning slightly northwest on South Shore Drive at Eagle Street.

On the north side of Fountain City, WIS 35 intersects with the western terminus of WIS 95 at North Street. WIS 35 continues north as North Shore Drive to the city limits.

WIS 35 continues northwest to its intersection with the southern terminus of WIS 88 outside the unincorporated community of Czechville. About  to the northwest, WIS 35 enters the city of Cochrane.

WIS 35 continues along the Mississippi River banks into the city of Alma. North of Alma, WIS 35 intersects with the western terminus of yet another state highway, WIS 37. WIS 35 continues into the city of Nelson, where it intersects with WIS 25.

WIS 25/WIS 35 continues north out of Nelson, curving to the west after their intersection with CTH-D. About half a mile (0.8 km) from CTH-D, WIS 25 turns due north while WIS 35 continues west as the Great River Road, crossing the Chippewa River into Pepin County.

Continuing its route along the Mississippi, WIS 35 goes through the community of Stockholm and turns to the north along the river banks before entering Pierce County.

In Pierce County, WIS 35 goes through the small community of Maiden Rock, Warrentown and Bay City. On the western end of Bay City, WIS 35 passes Red Wing Regional Airport, a municipal airport that serves the city of Red Wing, Minnesota on the other side of the Mississippi River.

About  from the airport, WIS 35 crosses US 63, just east of Hager City. US 63 continues north towards Ellsworth, while WIS 35 continues to the northwest through Diamond Bluff and into the city of Prescott, as Jefferson Street.

In downtown Prescott, WIS 35 intersects with US 10 at Cherry Street, just northeast of the confluence of the St. Croix and Mississippi rivers. US 10 westbound heads northeast across the mouth of the St. Croix into Minnesota as Point Douglas Drive, while WIS 35 and US 10 eastbound run north for about 11 blocks as Lake Street North to Cedar Street.

At Campbell Street North, WIS 35 turns to the northeast as US 10 continues east to start its long journey across the state of Wisconsin. The intersection of the two highways is also the western terminus of WIS 29, one of the main arterial routes connecting the Twin Cities area with Green Bay.

WIS 35/WIS 29 turns in a northeasterly direction into the city of River Falls, where it makes a right turn on to Cemetery Road, and hugs the City of River Falls southern boundary. When the two highways meet WIS 65 at a roundabout, the three highways continue north to the intersection of Cascade Avenue, where WIS 29 continues east out of the city.

WIS 35/WIS 65 continues north as a limited-access expressway across the county line into St. Croix County. At the north end of North Main Street in River Falls, WIS 65 heads to the northeast while WIS 35 continues to the northwest as a four-lane divided highway, all the way to its interchange with I-94 at exit 3, east of Hudson.

Hudson to St. Croix Falls
WIS 35 and US 12 head west with I-94 towards the St. Croix River and the Minnesota state line. At exit 1, WIS 35 exits from the freeway and heads north into the city of Hudson on Second Street. Crossing over the mouth of the Willow River, west of Lake Mallalieu, WIS 35 enters North Hudson as Sixth Street North.

Heading north out of the city, WIS 35 continues its route as a river-side highway, this time along the banks of the St. Croix into the city of Houlton. At Houlton, WIS 35 intersects with WIS 64, which runs for about a mile (1.6 km) to the southwest across the St. Croix River on the St. Croix Crossing bridge into Stillwater, Minnesota, where it becomes MN 36.

WIS 35/WIS 64 heads northeast out of the city of Houlton as a divided highway towards the city of Somerset. On the far southwestern side of the city, WIS 35/WIS 64 becomes a limited-access freeway that bypasses downtown Somerset. On the southeast side of the city, WIS 35 exits onto the eastern half of Business WIS 64, heading west and back into the city of Somerset.

WIS 35 turns to the north, about a block east of the Apple River, onto Church Hill Road.

After passing through the unincorporated town of East Farmington, WIS 35 continues on to the city of Osceola as Cascade Street. After crossing under a railroad bridge for the Osceola and St. Croix Valley Railway, WIS 35 intersects with the eastern terminus of WIS 243. This is one of only two eastern termini that WIS 35 intersects on its route through the state. WIS 243 is the shortest regularly-signed highway in Wisconsin, as it runs the length of Osceola Road over the St. Croix River to MN 243 in Franconia Township, Chisago County, Minnesota. The length of the highway in Wisconsin is only .

WIS 35 swings to the northeast on North Cascade Street through downtown Osceola, then out of the city. Passing Osceola Bedrock Glades State Natural Area, WIS 35 continues north towards the village of Dresser on its way to St. Croix Falls.

St. Croix Falls to Superior
In St. Croix Falls township, WIS 35 turns to the north while US 8 continues east to Turtle Lake.

WIS 35 continues north through the small towns of Centuria, Milltown and Luck. On the east side of Milltown, WIS 35 intersects with the western terminus of WIS 46 after the latter crosses the Gandy Dancer State Bicycle Trail. At First Avenue in Luck, WIS 35 intersects with WIS 48, which heads to the east along the northern edge of town. WIS 48 turns to the north with WIS 35, continuing into Frederic where WIS 48 turns west on West Oak Street.

WIS 35 continues on a northeastern route, through the unincorporated town of Lewis and across the county line into Burnett County.

In Burnett County, WIS 35 enters Siren, where it intersects with WIS 70 as Second Avenue at CTH-B. WIS 35/WIS 70 continues north out of the village limits to the Burnett County Airport. At the southern edge of the airport, WIS 70 heads east on Airport Road, while WIS 35 continues its northerly route. Passing through Webster, WIS 35 heads north toward Danbury.

WIS 35 passes Danbury to the east, intersecting with WIS 77 at Main Street East. WIS 35/WIS 77 continues to the north, coming within  from the Minnesota border at the mouth of the Yellow River. This segment is the 23rd different state trunk highway that shares its routing with WIS 35 in the state. About a mile and a half (2.4 km) northwest, WIS 77 heads east while WIS 35 continues to the northeast, crossing the Big Island State Natural Area and the St. Croix River and turning north into Douglas County.

Continuing north, WIS 35 passes through the unincorporated towns of Dairyland, Moose Junction, and Chaffey before entering Pattison State Park. WIS 35 crosses over the Manitou Falls Spillway in the park before turning northward to Superior.

WIS 35 enters Superior as Tower Avenue, running north through the South End neighborhood of the city. At 61st Street/Central Avenue, WIS 35 reaches the eastern terminus of WIS 105, the only other eastern terminus of a state highway that intersects with the route.

WIS 35 continues north into Superior, passing Richard I. Bong Airport into the downtown area. At Belknap Street, WIS 35 crosses US 2 at Center City Park. WIS 35 continues north for 12 blocks before turning east onto North Third Street.

WIS 35 turns east for four blocks, ending at both Hughitt Avenue and Hammond Avenue, at the foot of the John A. Blatnik Bridge across the Saint Louis Bay. The bridge takes I-535/US 53 over the bay to Duluth, Minnesota. I-535's southern terminus is also WIS 35's northern terminus.

History

WIS 35 was established in 1918 as a route between Saint Croix Falls and Danbury, Wisconsin. The highway was extended south to Somerset by 1921 and north to Superior shortly thereafter. A few years later it was expanded south to the Illinois border.
In October 2013, Wisconsin WIS 35 between Ferryville, Wisconsin and Prairie du Chien, Wisconsin was renamed in honor of former Governor of Wisconsin Patrick Lucey.

Major intersections

Business route 

Business State Trunk Highway 35 (Bus. WIS 35) in Holmen follows the former alignment of WIS 35, after the highway was realigned in 1990.

See also

References

External links

WIS 35 at the State Trunk Tour

035
035
Transportation in Grant County, Wisconsin
Transportation in Crawford County, Wisconsin
Transportation in Vernon County, Wisconsin
Transportation in La Crosse County, Wisconsin
Transportation in Trempealeau County, Wisconsin
Transportation in Buffalo County, Wisconsin
Transportation in Pepin County, Wisconsin
Transportation in Pierce County, Wisconsin
Transportation in St. Croix County, Wisconsin
Transportation in Polk County, Wisconsin
Transportation in Burnett County, Wisconsin
Transportation in Douglas County, Wisconsin